"Backstage Passes" is a song by American rapper EST Gee featuring American rapper Jack Harlow, from the former's debut studio album I Never Felt Nun (2022). Produced by Pooh Beatz and Nik Dean, it was sent to rhythmic contemporary radio on October 11, 2022 as the fifth single from the album.

Composition
The song sees EST Gee and Jack Harlow rapping about their prowess in their hometown of Louisville, Kentucky. The latter also mentions traveling to Cincinnati in his verse.

Critical reception
Paul Attard of Slant Magazine wrote a favorable review of the song:

There's one guest spot on I Never Felt Nun that effectively offsets the album's relentless bravado: Jack Harlow, whose cheeky swagger on the minimal "Backstage Passes" serves as a nice foil to Gee's self-serious fulminating. The native Louisvillians trade off their accomplishments on the track's chorus—Gee made it famous for "turkey bags," while Harlow gave its residents a few Guinness-sized "big records"—with a laidback charisma, exhibiting a natural rapport that veers into boyish playfulness. It's not a terribly flashy collaboration, especially given how barebones the track's production remains, but it exemplifies I Never Felt Nuns workmanlike ethos. If only that approach had been applied to the album's editing.

Music video
A music video for the song was released on September 16, 2022, alongside I Never Felt Nun. Directed by Cole Bennett, it opens with EST Gee and Jack Harlow sitting in a waiting room dressed in blue denim. The room shifts into a backdrop for a fitting session, matching the colors of the outfits that the rappers try on: red and white. Wearing the white outfits, Gee and Harlow step through a curtain and perform in front of a raucous crowd. At the end of the video, they return to the waiting room and the time for their appointment arrives.

Charts

References

2022 singles
2022 songs
EST Gee songs
Jack Harlow songs
Songs written by EST Gee
Songs written by Jack Harlow
Interscope Records singles